Alejandro Víctor Washington Atchugarry Bonomi (31 July 1952 in Montevideo – 19 February 2017 in Montevideo) was a Uruguayan lawyer and politician.

He was Minister of Economics and Finance during the most difficult period in Jorge Batlle's presidency, the 2002 Uruguay banking crisis, with a widely acknowledged role in the solution of Uruguay's worst economic moment in a century.

Atchugarry died of an aneurysm in Montevideo on 19 February 2017, aged 64.

Bibliography

References

1952 births
2017 deaths
Uruguayan people of Basque descent
People from Montevideo
University of the Republic (Uruguay) alumni
Ministers of Transport and Public Works of Uruguay
20th-century Uruguayan lawyers
Ministers of Economics and Finance of Uruguay
Colorado Party (Uruguay) politicians
Deaths from aneurysm

See also
 South American economic crisis of 2002
 1998–2002 Argentine great depression
 2002 Uruguay banking crisis
 Latin American debt crisis